The Legislature IV of Italy was the 4th legislature of the Italian Republic, and lasted from 16 May 1963 until 4 June 1968. Its composition was the one resulting from the general election of 28 April 1963.

Main chronology
Despite a good approval in public opinion, late Fanfani's reformist policy produced a significant mistrust of the Italian industrial class and the right-wing faction of the Christian Democracy (DC).

In the 1963 general election, the Christian Democrats lost almost one million votes, gaining nearly 38%, while the Communists arrived second with 25%. However the liberals surged to 7%, their best results ever, receiving many votes from former Christian Democratic supporters, who were against Fanfani's centre-left policies. With the decline of electoral support, the majority of DC members decided to replace Fanfani with a provisional government (also defined "governo balneare", literarily "seaside government", by many journalists) led by impartial President of the Chamber of Deputies, Giovanni Leone. When the congress of the Italian Socialist Party (PSI) in autumn that year authorized a full engagement of the party into the government, Leone resigned and Aldo Moro became the new Prime Minister.

Aldo Moro's government was unevenly supported by the DC, but also by the PSI, along with the minor Italian Republican Party (PRI) and Italian Democratic Socialist Party (PSDI). The coalition was also known as Organic Centre-left and was characterized by consociationalist and social corporatist tendencies.

During Moro's premiership, a wide range of social reforms were carried out. The 1967 Bridge Law (Legge Ponte) introduced urgent housing provisions as part of an envisioned reform of the entire sector, such as the introduction of minimum standards for housing and environment. A reform, promulgated on 14 December 1963, introduced an annual allowance for university students with income below a given level. Another law, promulgated on 10 March 1968, introduced voluntary public pre-elementary education for children aged three to five years. While a bill, approved on 21 July 1965, extended the program of social security. Moreover, the legal minimum wage was raised, all current pensions were revalued, seniority pensions were introduced (after 35 years of contributions workers could retire even before attaining pensionable age), and within the Social Security National Institute (INPS), a Social Fund (Fondo Sociale) was established, ensuring to all members pensioners a basic uniform pension largely financed by state, known as the "social pension". A law, approved on 22 July 1966, extended social security insurance to small traders, while law of 22 July 1966 extended health insurance to retired traders. Another important reform was implemented with a bill, approved on 29 May 1967, which extended compulsory health insurance to retired farmers, tenant farmers, and sharecroppers, and extended health insurance to the unemployed in receipt of unemployment benefits. Moreover, a law of 5 November 1968 extended family allowances to the unemployed  who received unemployment benefits.

On 25 June 1964, the government was beaten on the budget law for the Italian Ministry of Education concerning the financing of private education, and on the same day Moro resigned. The right-wing Christian Democratic President of Italy, Antonio Segni, during the presidential consultations for the formation of a new cabinet, asked the socialist leader Pietro Nenni to exit from the government majority.

On 16 July, Segni sent the Carabinieri general, Giovanni De Lorenzo, to a meeting of representatives of DC, to deliver a message in case the negotiations around the formation of a new centre-left government would fail. According to some historians, De Lorenzo reported that President Segni was ready to give a subsequent mandate to the President of the Senate Cesare Merzagora, asking him of forming a "president's government", composed by all the conservative forces in the Parliament. Moro, on the other hand, managed to form another centre-left majority. During the negotiations, Nenni had accepted the downsizing of his reform programs and, on 17 July, Moro went to the Quirinal Palace, with the acceptance of the assignment and the list of ministers of his second government.

In August 1964, President Segni suffered a serious cerebral hemorrhage and resigned after a few months. In December presidential election, Moro and his majority tried to elect a leftist politician at the Quirinal Palace. On the twenty-first round of voting, the leader of the PSDI and former President of the Constituent Assembly Giuseppe Saragat was elected president. Saragat was the first left-wing politician to become President of the Republic.

Despite the opposition by Segni and other prominent rightist Christian Democrats, the centre-left coalition, the first one for the Italian post-war political life, stayed in power for nearly five years, until the 1968 general election, which was characterised by a defeat for DC's centre-left allies.

Presidential election
On 16 December 1964 the Parliament met to elect the fourth President of Italy. On 28 December 1964 the democratic socialist Giuseppe Saragat was elected on the twenty-first ballot with 646 votes out of 927.

Government

Parliamentary composition

Chamber of Deputies

 Presidents: 
Giovanni Leone (DC), elected on 16 May 1963 and resigned on 21 June 1963;
Brunetto Bucciarelli-Ducci (DC), elected on 26 June 1963.
 Vice Presidents: Brunetto Bucciarelli-Ducci (DC, until 26 June 1963), Paolo Rossi (PSDI), Maria Lisa Cinciari Rodano (PCI), Sandro Pertini (PSI), Francesco Restivo (DC, from 11 July 1963 till 23 February 1966), Guido Gonella (DC, from 28 April 1966)

Senate of the Republic

Presidents: 
Cesare Merzagora (Ind), elected on 16 May 1963 and resigned on 7 November 1967;
Ennio Zelioli-Lanzini (DC), elected on 8 November 1967. 
 Vice Presidents: Giuseppe Spataro (DC), Domenico Macaggi (PSI, from 14 October 1964), Pietro Secchia (PCI), Ettore Tibaldi (PSI, till 7 October 1964), Ennio Zelioli-Lanzini (DC, till 8 November 1967),

Senators for Life

References

Legislatures of Italy
1963 establishments in Italy
1968 disestablishments in Italy